My Native Land, also called China, My Native Land, is a Mandarin-language film, released in 1980 by Ta Chung Motion Picture Corporation in Taiwan. It is a biographical film about the Hakka writer Chung Li-ho.

Cast
 Chin Han as Chung Li-ho
 Joan Lin

Crew
 Director: Li Hsing
 Presented by Ruby Loke
 Planned by Liu Teng-shan
 Screenplay by Chang Yung-hsiang
 Cinematography: Chen Kuen-hao
 Executive producer: Chen Ru-ling
 Lighting by Lee Ya-tung

Soundtrack
The songs of the 1980 soundtrack album are sung by Teresa Teng. It was released as yuan xiangren by Polydor Records and yuan xiangqing nong by Kolin Records. The songs written by Zhuang Nu and Tony Wong and "Evening Wind and Flower Scent" are heard in the film.

The soundtrack was re-released in 1981 by Polydor Records as yuan xiangqing nong. Two tracks are replaced, and another track is added. All releases have film theme songs intact.

References

External links
 
 

1980 films
1980s Mandarin-language films
Taiwanese drama films
Biographical films about writers
Films directed by Li Hsing
Films with screenplays by Chang Yung-hsiang